Dark December may refer to:

Dark December The Full Account of the Battle of the Bulge, a 1947 history book by American Robert E. Merriam
"Dark December" (Playhouse 90), an episode of American TV series Playhouse 90 based on Merriam's book
Dark December (novel), a 1960 post-holocaust novel by American Alfred Coppel